TSEC may refer to:

 Taiwan Stock Exchange Corporation
 The former name of the techno band Lagoona
 Thadomal Shahani Engineering College, Mumbai
 The Solid Energy Crew
 Telecommunications Security
 TATA Social Enterprise Challenge
 Tissue-selective estrogen complex

See also
 TESC (disambiguation)